Hunley is a surname. Notable people with the surname include:

People
Con Hunley (born 1945), American country music singer
Gary Hunley (born 1948), American child actor
Helen Hunley (born 1920), Canadian politician
Horace Lawson Hunley (1823-1863), American marine engineer
Leann Hunley (born 1955), American actor
Ricky Hunley (born 1961), American football player

Fictional characters
 Alan Hunley, a fictional character from the 2018 film Mission: Impossible – Fallout

See also
Hundley (surname)
Huntley (name)
Hunley (disambiguation)